Behrens v. Pelletier, 516 U.S. 299 (1996), was a United States Supreme Court case in which the Court held a defendant's immediate appeal of an unfavorable qualified immunity ruling on a motion to dismiss does not deprive the court of appeals of jurisdiction over a second appeal, also based on qualified immunity, immediately following denial of summary judgment.

Background

The Federal Home Loan Bank Board fired Robert Pelletier (Plaintiff) as the provisional managing officer of Pioneer Savings and Loans Associations after the agent responsible for monitoring Pioneer's operations, John Behrens (Defendant), recommended such action.  The basis of Behrens recommendation was an investigation involving the collapse of another financial institution, and possible misconduct by Pelletier.  Pelletier filled suite arguing wrongfully termination, and John Behrens claimed he was acting on behalf of the government and therefore was he was entitled to qualified immunity.

Issue

At issue is if a defendant's initial appeal for qualified immunity is unfavorable, does this ruling deprive the court of appeals jurisdiction of over a subsequent appeal based on the same claim, i.e., qualified immunity.

See also
 List of United States Supreme Court cases, volume 516
 List of United States Supreme Court cases
 Lists of United States Supreme Court cases by volume
 List of United States Supreme Court cases by the Rehnquist Court

References

External links
 
http://www.quimbee.com

United States civil procedure case law
United States Supreme Court cases
United States Supreme Court cases of the Rehnquist Court
1996 in United States case law